Behind the Mask is a Hulu original documentary series chronicles the trials and tribulations of sports mascots. The 20-episode series focuses on the unsung heroes of sports, mascots.

The series follows the lives of seven mascots at different levels, both inside and outside the suit. The series focuses on mascots at four levels: high school, college, minor leagues, and major leagues and in professional freelancing.

The first season of the series premiered on October 29, 2013 on Hulu and Hulu Plus and the season finale aired on December 17, 2013. The second season of the series premiered on February 25, 2015.

On March 26, 2014, the National Academy of Television Arts and Sciences (NATAS) has announced that the show has earned a Sports Emmy nomination for Outstanding New Approaches in Sports Programming, a first for Hulu.

Synopsis
Rooty is adored by cheerleaders when he's in the outfit, but ignored by them out of it. The student behind Hey Reb is on the Bluto/Van Wilder academic track, currently in his sixth year. Tux has half the income he once had, as he pursues his dreams of working in the NHL and Bango must juggle five kids along with injuries he has sustained.

Featured Mascots (Season 1)
The four mascots featured are:

Season 2
Season 2 cast members were announced on November 5, 2014. The 10-episode season aired in February on Hulu. Only one of the four mascots from Season 1 returned for the second season in the series: Chad "Tux The Penguin" Spencer. Spencer was joined by Lou Seal of the San Francisco Giants, Chris Hall (a freelance mascot who has autism), and 17-year-old Gilbert Arizona High School mascot Navey "The Tiger" Baker. Season 2 premiered on February 26, 2015.

Featured Mascots (Season 2)
The four mascots featured are:

References

2010s American documentary television series
2013 American television series debuts
2015 American television series endings
Hulu original programming